Astore is the capital of Astore District in Gilgit-Baltistan, Pakistan.

The major Astore–Burzul Road, which linked Gilgit (in Pakistani-administered Kashmir) to Srinagar (in Indian-administered Kashmir) was indefinitely closed in 1978 following the development of the China–Pakistan Karakoram Highway.

Climate
Astore has a continental climate (Köppen Dsb).

References

Populated places in Astore District
Astore District